Away from the Sun is the second studio album recorded by American rock band 3 Doors Down. It was released by Universal Music Group on November 12, 2002. The singles released for the album were as follows: "When I'm Gone", "The Road I'm On", "Here Without You", and "Away from the Sun". The recording sessions took place during the summer of 2002 with producer and engineer Rick Parashar at London Bridge Studio, in Seattle, Washington. Rush guitarist Alex Lifeson performed live with the band during their premiere party in Biloxi for Away from the Sun. The album has sold eight million copies worldwide, including well over four million in the US alone.

DualDisc version
This album was included among a group of 15 DualDisc releases that were test marketed in two cities: Boston and Seattle. The test market DualDisc version of the album is rare. In 2005 the DualDisc version was reissued in a more widely distributed version. The original test market version differs from this common version in both packaging elements and in the design of the back of the inlay card.

The DualDisc has the standard CD album on one side, and a DVD-Audio/DVD-Video on the second side. The DVD-Audio portion contains the entire album in advanced resolution 5.1 PCM surround sound and 2.0 PCM stereo. The PCM audio was recorded at 96 kHz and 24bit for both audio tracks, but the 5.1 audio track is at 13,824kbit/s and the 2.0 audio track is at 4,608kbit/s. Special features for the DVD-Audio include the band's biography, a photo gallery and lyrics for the listed tracks only (not for the hidden track "This Time"). The DVD-Video portion contains the entire album in 5.1 Dolby Digital surround sound and 2.0 Dolby Digital stereo. The DVD side also features the music video for the song "The Road I'm On" directed by The Malloys.

Track listing
All songs written by 3 Doors Down, except "Dangerous Game" and "Sarah Yellin" by Arnold, Roberts and Harrell.

Music videos
 "When I'm Gone" (two versions)
 "The Road I'm On"
 "Here Without You"
 "Away from the Sun"

Personnel
3 Doors Down
Brad Arnold – lead vocals
Matt Roberts – lead guitar, backing vocals
Chris Henderson – rhythm guitar, backing vocals
Todd Harrell – bass guitar
Josh Freese – drums

Additional musicians
David Campbell – strings 
Rick Hopkins – Hammond B3
Matthew Burgess – percussion

Production
Zach Blackstone – assistant
David Campbell – string arrangements, orchestral arrangement, string conductor, concertmaster
Sandy Brummels – creative director
Steve Churchyard – engineer
Joel Derouin – concertmaster
Ted Jensen – mastering
Suzie Katayama – orchestra manager
Dean Maher – engineer, digital editing, mixing assistant
George Marino – mastering
Frank Ockenfels – photography
Geoff Ott – engineer, digital editing, overdub engineer
Rick Parashar – producer, engineer, digital editing
Bill Richards – product manager
Paul Silveira – mixing assistant
Honchol Sin – assistant engineer, assistant
Gordon Sran – assistant, overdub assistant
Randy Staub – mixing
Tom Sweeney – assistant engineer, assistant
Latif Tayour – assistant engineer, assistant, overdub assistant
Karen Walker – art direction, design

Charts

Weekly charts

Year-end charts

Decade-end charts

Certifications

References

3 Doors Down albums
Universal Records albums
Albums produced by Rick Parashar
2002 albums
Music video compilation albums